The 1889 Welsh Cup Final, the 12th in the competition, was contested by Bangor and Northwich Victoria at the Racecourse Ground. Bangor, in their first Welsh Cup final, won 2–1 in a match that would mark the first time these two teams, future founders and rivals of the Northern Premier League and Alliance Premier League would meet in a major final. The most recent was the 1984 FA Trophy Final.

Route to the final

Bangor

Northwich Victoria

Match

See also

Notes

References

Bibliography

Notes

External links 
RSSSF: Wales - List of Cup Finals
Welsh Football Data Archive: WELSH CUP 1888/89
Welsh Football Data Archive: WELSH CUP FINAL 1888/89

1889
1888–89 in Welsh football
Bangor City F.C. matches
Northwich Victoria F.C. matches